Hubbert is a surname. Notable people with the surname include:

Paul Hubbert (1935-2014), American politician
Brad Hubbert (born 1941), American football player
M. King Hubbert (1903–1989), American geoscientist

See also
Hubbertville, Alabama, unincorporated community, United States
Hubbert Peak theory, theory on petroleum production named after M. King Hubbert
Hubert

Surnames from given names